Kokopo District is a district of East New Britain Province in Papua New Guinea. It is one of the four administrative districts that make up the province.

See also
Districts of Papua New Guinea

References

Districts of Papua New Guinea